Theresa Lee is a Hong Kong-born Canadian actress.

Career 
Lee started her acting career in Hong Kong after placing second runner-up in the 1994 Miss Hong Kong Pageant. Most of her acting career has been in Greater China, but she has also appeared in notable North American films and TV series.

Filmography

Films

Television

See also 
 Natalie Wong

References

External links 

 Theresa Lee Yi Hung at hkcinemagic.com

Living people
Hong Kong film actresses
Hong Kong television actresses
Canadian film actresses
Canadian television actresses
20th-century Hong Kong actresses
21st-century Hong Kong actresses
20th-century Canadian actresses
21st-century Canadian actresses
Hong Kong emigrants to Canada
1970 births